Spiro Kalemi (born 1937, in Kavajë) is an Albanian musicologist. He has written a number of books and publications.

See also
 List of Albanian writers
 List of musicologists

References

Date of birth missing (living people)
1937 births
Albanian-language writers
Albanian musicologists
Living people
20th-century musicologists
21st-century musicologists
Music critics from Kavajë